The January Man is a 1989 American crime comedy directed by Pat O'Connor from a screenplay by John Patrick Shanley.

The film stars Kevin Kline as Nick Starkey, a smart ex-NYPD detective who is lured back into service by his police commissioner brother (Harvey Keitel) when a serial killer terrorizes the city. Nick becomes involved with the mayor's daughter (Mary Elizabeth Mastrantonio) and is aided in his investigation by his neighbor, Ed, an artist (Alan Rickman).

Plot
On New Year's Eve, Manhattan socialite Alison Hawkins returns home from the evening's festivities. As she feeds her fish before going to bed, she is strangled to death by an undetected intruder with a blue ribbon. It is the latest murder by a serial killer who has been terrorizing the city for eleven months.

The mayor, frustrated with the lack of progress in the case, tells NYPD commissioner Frank Starkey to bring in his brother, former detective Nick Starkey, being the only man brilliant enough to catch the killer. This is a controversial assignment for Frank because Nick left the force in disgrace two years earlier. 

Frank talks Nick into returning, but only on the condition that he be able to cook dinner the next night for Frank's wife, Christine, who is Nick's ex-girlfriend. After a press conference announcing Nick's reinstatement, Christine and Nick have dinner. Old wounds are opened, including mention of a canceled check which indicated that Frank was involved in the scandal that got Nick fired.

After reporting for work, Nick takes a different office than the one he was assigned because the light was not to the liking of his friend Ed, a painter. After getting Captain Alcoa to add Ed to the payroll as his assistant, Nick begins work on the case. His first lead is to speak to the mayor's daughter, Bernadette, who was a friend of Alison. After Nick and Bernadette visit Alison's apartment, he decides to let her stay at his apartment because she is too frightened to return to her own.

Nick realizes that the previous murders occurred on dates that are prime numbers, all of which are among the twelve prime numbers possible up to the number 31. Because 5 is the only one of the prime numbers that has not been used, Nick deduces that the next murder will take place the following night, on the fifth of the month. However, Nick is seemingly proven wrong when a woman is strangled one day ahead of Nick's prediction, after which the killer leaps out the window to his death. Nick believes that this is a copycat killing, especially when he learns that the man broke a window, as opposed to picking a lock to gain entrance as in the other murders. Frank and the mayor consider the case closed and are content to be done with Nick.

Nick and Ed figure out that the position of the victims' buildings, when seen on a map of Manhattan, forms the constellation Virgo. They also realize that all the rooms in which the murders took place have windows on the front of the building, and that when the exterior positions of the windows are lined up together according to which floor they are on, they correlate to eleven notes in the chorus of the song "Calendar Girl". This enables them to identify where the killer will next strike.

Nick sets a trap with Bernadette as bait, outfitting her with a neck guard to prevent the killer from strangling her. The trio stakes out the room in a supply closet and witness the killer picking the lock to get into the apartment. They intercept the apartment's resident and send Bernadette in, where she is attacked. Nick breaks in and, after a prolonged struggle with the killer, subdues him. He then wraps him up in the hall carpet and delivers him to the police outside the building.

Christine arrives and tells Nick she's broken up with Frank and hopes to reconcile. He rejects her in favor of a relationship with Bernadette.

Cast

 Kevin Kline as Lt. Nick Starkey
 Susan Sarandon as Christine Starkey
 Mary Elizabeth Mastrantonio as Bernadette Flynn
 Harvey Keitel as Commissioner Frank Starkey
 Danny Aiello as Capt. Vincent Alcoa
 Rod Steiger as Mayor Eamon Flynn
 Alan Rickman as Ed
 Faye Grant as Alison Hawkins
 Kenneth Welsh as Roger Culver 
 Bruce MacVittie as Rip
 Bill Cobbs as Detective Reilly 
 Gerard Parkes as Reverend Drew
 Malachy McCourt as Hob
 Colin Mochrie as Pat

Reception
The movie received negative reviews from critics. Roger Ebert, of the Chicago Sun-Times, called it "one of the worst movies of all time", writing: "The January Man is worth study as a film that fails to find its tone. It's all over the map. It wants to be zany but violent, satirical but slapstick, romantic but cynical. It wants some of its actors to rant and rave like amateur tragedians, and others to reach for subtle nuances. And it wants all of these things to happen at the same time." Rita Kempley of The Washington Post was even more harsh, writing, "Eliot called April the cruelest month, but then he hadn't seen The January Man. Billed as a mystery with romance and comedy, it is a damp sock of a movie that makes you wish for a leap year."

The film's box-office gross (in the USA) was $4,611,062. It holds a 24% rating on Rotten Tomatoes from 17 reviews.

References

External links
 
 
 
 

1989 films
1980s police comedy films
American comedy thriller films
1980s crime thriller films
American serial killer films
1980s comedy thriller films
American police detective films
Films set in New York City
Metro-Goldwyn-Mayer films
Films directed by Pat O'Connor
Films scored by Marvin Hamlisch
Films with screenplays by John Patrick Shanley
1989 comedy films
1980s English-language films
1980s American films